Jabal 'Okran is a mountain of Saudi Arabia located in As-Sarawat 'Asir Region at 18°57′05″N 42°08′49″E.

The mountain height is 2,551meters above sea level.

References

Okran